Bennett is an unincorporated community in the town of Bennett, Douglas County, Wisconsin, United States.

U.S. Highway 53, County Road L, and County Road E are three of the main routes in the community.

History
Bennett was named for Richard Bennett, who built a siding to his business. A post office was established as Bennett Siding in 1892, and the name was changed to Bennett in 1899; the post office closed in 1984.

References

Unincorporated communities in Douglas County, Wisconsin
Unincorporated communities in Wisconsin